Dag Hjalmar Agne Carl Hammarskjöld (29 July 1905 – 18 September 1961) was a Swedish economist and diplomat who served as the second Secretary-General of the United Nations from April 1953 until his death in a plane crash in September 1961. As of 2022, he remains the youngest person to have held the post, having been only 47 years old when he was appointed.

Hammarskjöld's tenure was characterized by efforts to strengthen the newly formed UN both internally and externally. He led initiatives to improve morale and organisational efficiency while seeking to make the UN more responsive to global issues. He presided over the creation of the first UN peacekeeping forces in Egypt and the Congo and personally intervened to defuse or resolve diplomatic crises. Hammarskjöld's second term was cut short when he died in a plane crash while en route to cease-fire negotiations during the Congo Crisis.

Hammarskjöld was and remains well regarded internationally as a capable diplomat and administrator, and his efforts to resolve various global crises led to him being the only posthumous recipient of the Nobel Peace Prize. He is considered one of the two best UN secretaries-general, along with his successor U Thant, and his appointment has been hailed as one of the most notable successes for the organization. U.S. President John F. Kennedy called Hammarskjöld "the greatest statesman of our century."

Early life and education

Dag Hammarskjöld was born in Jönköping to the noble family Hammarskjöld (also spelled Hammarskiöld or Hammarsköld). He spent most of his childhood in Uppsala. His home there, which he considered his childhood home, was Uppsala Castle. He was the fourth and youngest son of Hjalmar Hammarskjöld, Prime Minister of Sweden from 1914 to 1917.

Hammarskjöld studied first at Katedralskolan and then at Uppsala University. By 1930, he had obtained Licentiate of Philosophy and Master of Laws degrees. Before he finished his law degree he had already obtained a job as Assistant Secretary of the Unemployment Committee.

Career
From 1930 to 1934, Hammarskjöld was Secretary of a governmental committee on unemployment. During this time he wrote his economics thesis, "Konjunkturspridningen" ("The Spread of the Business Cycle"), and received a doctorate from Stockholm University. In 1936, he became a secretary in Sweden's central bank, the Riksbank. From 1941 to 1948, he served as chairman of the Riksbank's General Council.

Hammarskjöld quickly developed a successful career as a Swedish public servant. He was state secretary in the Ministry of Finance 1936–1945, Swedish delegate to the Organization for European Economic Cooperation 1947–1953, cabinet secretary for the Ministry of Foreign Affairs 1949–1951 and minister without portfolio in Tage Erlander's government 1951–1953.

He helped coordinate government plans to alleviate the economic problems of the post-World War II period and was a delegate to the Paris conference that established the Marshall Plan. In 1950, he became head of the Swedish delegation to UNISCAN, a forum to promote economic cooperation between the United Kingdom and the Scandinavian countries. Although Hammarskjöld served in a cabinet dominated by the Social Democrats, he never officially joined any political party.

In 1951, Hammarskjöld was vice chairman of the Swedish delegation to the United Nations General Assembly in Paris. He became the chairman of the Swedish delegation to the General Assembly in New York in 1952. On 20 December 1954, he was elected to take his father's vacated seat in the Swedish Academy.

United Nations Secretary-General

Nomination and election 

On 10 November 1952, Trygve Lie announced his resignation as Secretary-General of the United Nations. Several months of negotiations ensued between the Western powers and the Soviet Union without reaching an agreement on his successor. On 13 and 19 March 1953, the Security Council voted on four candidates. Lester B. Pearson of Canada was the only candidate to receive the required majority, but he was vetoed by the Soviet Union. At a consultation of the permanent members on 30 March 1953, French permanent representative Henri Hoppenot suggested four candidates, including Hammarskjöld, whom he had met at the Organisation for European Economic Cooperation.

The superpowers hoped to seat a Secretary-General who would focus on administrative issues and refrain from participating in political discussion. Hammarskjöld's reputation at the time was, in the words of biographer Emery Kelèn, "that of a brilliant economist, an unobtrusive technician, and an aristo-bureaucrat". As a result, there was little to no controversy in his selection; the Soviet permanent representative, Valerian Zorin, found Hammarskjöld "harmless". Zorin declared that he would be voting for Hammarskjöld, surprising the Western powers. The announcement set off a flurry of diplomatic activity. British Foreign Secretary Anthony Eden was strongly in favor of Hammarskjöld and asked the United States to "take any appropriate action to induce the [Nationalist] Chinese to abstain". (Sweden recognized the People's Republic of China and faced a potential veto from the Republic of China.) At the U.S. State Department, the nomination "came as a complete surprise to everyone here and we started scrambling around to find out who Mr. Hammarskjold was and what his qualifications were". The State Department authorized Henry Cabot Lodge Jr., the US Ambassador, to vote in favor after he told them that Hammarskjöld "may be as good as we can get".

On 31 March 1953, the Security Council voted 10-0-1 to recommend Hammarskjöld to the General Assembly, with an abstention from Nationalist China. Shortly after midnight on 1 April 1953, Hammarskjöld was awakened by a telephone call from a journalist with the news, which he dismissed as an April Fool's Day joke. He finally believed the news after the third phone call. The Swedish mission in New York confirmed the nomination at 03:00 and a communique from the Security Council was soon thereafter delivered to him. After consulting with the Swedish cabinet and his father, Hammarskjöld decided to accept the nomination. He sent a wire to the Security Council:

With strong feeling personal insufficiency I hesitate to accept candidature but I do not feel I could refuse to assume the task imposed on me should the [UN General] Assembly follow the recommendation of the Security Council by which I feel deeply honoured.

Later in the day, Hammarskjöld held a press conference at the Swedish Foreign Ministry. According to diplomat Sverker Åström, he displayed an intense interest and knowledge in the affairs of the UN, which he had never shown any indication of before.

The UN General Assembly voted 57-1-1 on 7 April 1953 to appoint Dag Hammarskjöld as Secretary-General of the United Nations. Hammarskjöld was sworn in as Secretary-General on 10 April 1953. He was unanimously reelected on 26 September 1957 for another term, taking effect on 10 April 1958.

Tenure 

Immediately following the assumption of the Secretariat, Hammarskjöld attempted to establish a good rapport with his staff. He made a point of visiting every UN department to shake hands with as many workers as possible, eating in the cafeteria as often as possible, and relinquishing the Secretary-General's private elevator for general use. He began his term by establishing his own secretariat of 4,000 administrators and setting up regulations that defined their responsibilities. He was also actively engaged in smaller projects relating to the UN working environment; for example, he spearheaded the building of a meditation room at the UN headquarters, where people can withdraw into themselves in silence, regardless of their faith, creed, or religion.

During his term, Hammarskjöld tried to improve relations between Israel and the Arab states. Other highlights include a 1955 visit to China to negotiate the release of 11 captured US pilots who had served in the Korean War, the 1956 establishment of the United Nations Emergency Force, and his intervention in the 1956 Suez Crisis. He is given credit by some historians for allowing participation of the Holy See within the UN that year.

In 1960, the newly independent Congo asked for UN aid in defusing the Congo Crisis. Hammarskjöld made four trips to Congo, but his efforts toward the decolonisation of Africa were considered insufficient by the Soviet Union; in September 1960, the Soviet government denounced his decision to send a UN emergency force to keep the peace. They demanded his resignation and the replacement of the office of Secretary-General by a three-man directorate with a built-in veto, the "troika". The objective was, citing the memoirs of Soviet leader Nikita Khrushchev, to "equally represent interests of three groups of countries: capitalist, socialist and recently independent".

The UN sent a nearly 20,000-strong peacekeeping force to restore order in Congo-Kinshasa. Hammarskjöld's refusal to place peacekeepers in the service of Lumumba's constitutionally elected government provoked a strong reaction of disapproval from the Soviets. The situation would become more scandalous with the assassination of Lumumba by Tshombe's troops. In February 1961, the UN authorized the Peacekeeping Forces to use military force to prevent civil war. The Blue Helmets' attack on Katanga caused Tshombe to flee to Zambia. Hammarskjöld's erratic attitude in not providing support to Lumumba's government, which had been elected by popular vote, drew severe criticism among non-aligned countries and communist and socialist countries. In the end, his actions were supported only by the United States and Belgium.

His final report to the United Nations was some 6,000 words and is considered to be one of his most important. The report was dictated in single afternoon to his assistant, Hannah Platz.

Death

On 18 September 1961, Hammarskjöld was en route to negotiate a cease-fire between United Nations Operation in the Congo forces and Katangese troops under Moise Tshombe. His Douglas DC-6 airliner SE-BDY crashed near Ndola, Northern Rhodesia (now Zambia). Hammarskjöld perished as a result of the crash, as did all of the 15 other passengers. Hammarskjöld's death set off a succession crisis at the United Nations, as there was no line of succession and the Security Council had to vote on a successor.

The circumstances of the crash are still unclear. A 1962 Rhodesian inquiry concluded that pilot error was to blame, while a later UN investigation could not determine the cause of the crash. There is evidence suggesting the plane was shot down. A CIA report claimed the KGB was responsible.

The day after the crash, former U.S. President Harry Truman commented that Hammarskjöld "was on the point of getting something done when they killed him. Notice that I said 'when they killed him'."

In 1998, documents surfaced suggesting CIA, MI6, and/or Belgian mining interest involvement via a South African paramilitary organization. The information was contained in a file from the South African National Intelligence Agency turned over to the South African Truth and Reconciliation Commission in relation to the 1993 assassination of Chris Hani, leader of the South African Communist Party. These documents included an alleged plot to "remove" Hammarskjöld and contained a supposed statement from CIA director Allen Dulles that "Dag is becoming troublesome … and should be removed." Hammarskjöld's mission to end the war over the mineral-rich Katangese secession from the newly formed Republic of the Congo was contrary to the interests of those organizations. However these documents were copies rather than originals, precluding substantiation of authenticity through ink and paper testing.

Göran Björkdahl, a Swedish aid worker whose father worked for the UN in Zambia, wrote in 2011 that he believed Hammarskjöld's death was a murder committed, in part, to benefit mining companies like Union Minière, after Hammarskjöld had made the UN intervene in the Katanga crisis. Björkdahl based his assertion on interviews with witnesses of the plane crash near the border of the DRC with Zambia and on archival documents.

In 2013 accident investigator Sven Hammarberg was asked by the International Commission of Jurists to investigate Hammarskjöld's death.

In 2014, newly declassified documents revealed that the American ambassador to the Congo sent a cable to Washington D.C. warning that the plane could have been shot down by Belgian mercenary pilot , commander of the small Katanga Air Force. Van Risseghem died in 2007.

On 16 March 2015, United Nations Secretary-General Ban Ki-moon appointed members to an Independent Panel of Experts to examine new information related to Hammarskjöld's death. The three-member panel was led by Mohamed Chande Othman, the Chief Justice of Tanzania, and included Kerryn Macaulay (Australia's representative to the International Civil Aviation Organization) and Henrik Larsen (a ballistics expert from the Danish National Police). The panel's 99-page report, released 6 July 2015, assigned "moderate" value to nine new eyewitness accounts and transcripts of radio transmissions. Those accounts suggested that Hammarskjöld's plane was already on fire as it landed and that other jet aircraft and intelligence agents were nearby.

In 2016, the original documents from the 1998 South African investigation surfaced. Those familiar with the investigation cautioned that even if authentic, the documents could have been initially authored as part of a disinformation campaign.

In 2017, Airplane Disasters Series 9, Episode 10: "Deadly Mission" analyzed the crash, hypothesizing that the pilot attempting the night landing simply flew into an uncharted hill near the airport.

In 2019, the documentary film Cold Case Hammarskjöld by Danish filmmaker Mads Brügger claimed that Jan van Risseghem had told a friend that he shot down Hammarskjöld's aircraft. This went against the official stance maintained by van Risseghem's family that he was not involved in the death of Hammarskjöld. According to an interview with van Risseghem's wife, he was in Rhodesia negotiating the purchase of a plane for the Katanga Air Force, with the logbooks providing "proof that he was not flying for Katanga at the time". The documentary crew interviewed multiple colleagues of van Risseghem for the film, all of whom supported their theory. In an interview with Swedish historian Leif Hellström, van Risseghem claimed that he was not in southern Africa at the time the crash happened, and dismissed the idea of his being potentially involved as "fairy stories".

Previously unpublished documents continue to emerge from UN or national archives. One found in France amidst the Fonds Focccart (National Archives in Pierrefitte) in November 2021 is a death warrant for Hammarskjöld signed by the infamous OAS, the secret organisation nestled in the French army at the time of Algeria's war of independence. The document reads: "It is high time to put an end to his harmful intrusion (…) this sentence common to justice and fairness to be carried out, as soon as possible". The source was revealed by French journalist Maurin Picard, according to whom the links between the white mercenaries in Katanga and OAS are overt.

In Hammarskjöld's 1959 will he left his personal archive to the National Library of Sweden.

Personal life 

In 1953, soon after his appointment as United Nations Secretary-General, Hammarskjöld was interviewed on radio by Edward R. Murrow. In this talk, Hammarskjöld declared:

But the explanation of how a man should live a life of active social service in full harmony with himself as a member of the community of spirit, I found in the writings of those great medieval mystics [Meister Eckhart and Jan van Ruysbroek] for whom 'self-surrender' had been the way to self-realization, and who in 'singleness of mind' and 'inwardness' had found the strength to say yes to every demand which the needs of their neighbours made them face, and to say yes also to every fate life had in store for them when they followed the call of duty as they understood it.

Hammarskjöld's only book, Vägmärken (Markings, or more literally Waymarks), was published in 1963. A collection of his diary reflections, the book starts in 1925, when he was 20 years old, and ends the month before his death in 1961. This diary was found in his New York house, after his death, along with an undated letter addressed to then Swedish Permanent Under-Secretary for Foreign Affairs, . In this letter, Hammarskjöld wrote:

These entries provide the only true 'profile' that can be drawn ... If you find them worth publishing, you have my permission to do so.

The foreword is written by the English poet W. H. Auden, a friend of Hammarskjöld's.

Markings was described by the late theologian Henry P. Van Dusen as "the noblest self-disclosure of spiritual struggle and triumph, perhaps the greatest testament of personal faith written ... in the heat of professional life and amidst the most exacting responsibilities for world peace and order". Hammarskjöld wrote, for example:

We are not permitted to choose the frame of our destiny. But what we put into it is ours. He who wills adventure will experience it – according to the measure of his courage. He who wills sacrifice will be sacrificed – according to the measure of his purity of heart.

Markings is characterised by Hammarskjöld's intermingling of prose and haiku poetry in a manner exemplified by the 17th-century Japanese poet Basho in his Narrow Roads to the Deep North. In his foreword to Markings, W. H. Auden quotes Hammarskjöld as stating:

In our age, the road to holiness necessarily passes through the world of action.

Hammarskjöld's interest in philosophical and spiritual matters is also proven by the finding of Martin Buber's main work I and Thou, which he was translating into Swedish, in the wreckage after the plane crash.

The Evangelical Lutheran Church in America commemorates the life of Hammarskjöld as a renewer of society on the anniversary of his death, 18 September.

Legacy

Honors
 Honorary degrees: Carleton University in Ottawa (then called Carleton College) awarded its first-ever honorary degree to Hammarskjöld in 1954, when it presented him with a Legum Doctor, honoris causa. The university has continued this tradition by conferring an honorary doctorate upon every subsequent Secretary-General of the United Nations. He also held honorary degrees from Oxford University, United Kingdom; in the United States from Harvard, Yale, Princeton, Columbia, the University of Pennsylvania, Amherst, Johns Hopkins, the University of California, and Ohio University; in Sweden, Uppsala University; and in Canada from McGill University as well as Carleton University, in Ottawa.

People's views
 John F. Kennedy: After Hammarskjöld's death, U.S. president John F. Kennedy regretted that he had opposed the UN policy in the Congo and said: "I realise now that in comparison to him, I am a small man. He was the greatest statesman of our century."
 In 2011, The Financial Times wrote that Hammarskjöld has remained the benchmark against which later UN Secretaries-General have been judged.

Named structures

 Buildings and rooms:
Dag Hammarskjöld Library: On 16 November 1961, shortly after the death of Secretary-General Dag Hammarskjöld, the newly-completed Library building at United Nations Headquarters in New York was named the Dag Hammarskjöld Library.
Stanford University: Dag Hammarskjöld House, on the Stanford University campus, is a residence cooperative for undergraduate and graduate students with international backgrounds and interests at Stanford.
Hammarskjold High School: Public high school located in the town of Thunder Bay, Ontario, Canada.
Hammarskjold Middle School: Public middle school located in the town of East Brunswick, New Jersey.
Dag Hammarskjöld Middle School: Public middle school located in the town of Wallingford, Connecticut.
Dag Hammarskjöld Elementary School: Public elementary school located in Sheepshead Bay, Brooklyn, New York.
 Streets:
 :de:Hammarskjöldplatz is the wide square to the north entrance of the Messe Berlin fairgrounds in Berlin, Germany.
 Hammarskjöldring is a street in Frankfurt, Germany, connecting the boroughs Mertonviertel and Niederursel.
 Dag Hammarskjöld Plaza is a public park near the headquarters of the United Nations in New York City.

Other commemorations

 Dag Hammarskjöld Foundation:  In 1962, the Dag Hammarskjöld Foundation was created as Sweden's national memorial to Dag Hammarskjöld.
 Memorial awards:
 Medal: On 22 July 1997, the UN Security Council Resolution 1121 established the Dag Hammarskjöld Medal in recognition and commemoration of those who have lost their lives as a result of UN peacekeeping operations.
 Prize in Peace and Conflict Studies: Colgate University annually awards a student the Dag Hammarskjöld Prize in Peace and Conflict Studies based on outstanding work in the program.
 Postage stamps: Many countries issued postage stamps commemorating Hammarskjöld.
 On 6 April 2011, Sweden's central bank, the Riksbank, announced that Hammarskjöld's image would be used on the 1000-kronor banknote, the highest-denomination banknote in Sweden. The new currency was introduced in 2015.

Depictions in music and popular culture
The Australian-British composer Malcolm Williamson, Master of the Queen's Music, wrote his Hammarskjöld Portrait for soprano and string orchestra in 1974. The text was taken from Vägmärken, and the work's first performance took place on 30 July 1974, at a Royal Albert Hall Proms Concert, with the soprano Elisabeth Söderström, and the BBC Symphony Orchestra conducted by John Pritchard.

In the 2016 film The Siege of Jadotville, depicting the events of the Congo Crisis, in the movie, his plane is purposely shot down by an unidentified fighter jet plane. Hammarskjöld is played by fellow Swede Mikael Persbrandt.

See also

List of unsolved deaths

Notes

References

Bibliography
 Durel, Bernard, op, (2002), «Au jardin secret d'un diplomate suédois: Jalons de Dag Hammarskjöld, un itinéraire spirituel», La Vie Spirituelle (Paris). T. 82, pp. 901–922.
 .
 
 Kelen, Emery (1966) Hammarskjold. Putnam.
 Lichello, Robert (1972) "Dag Hammarskjold: A Giant in Diplomacy."  Samhar Press, Charlotteville, N.Y. .
 
 Urquhart, Brian, (1972), Hammarskjold. Alfred A. Knopf, New York.
 Velocci, Giovanni, cssr, (1998), «Hammarskjold Dag», in Luigi Borriello, ocd – Edmondo Caruana, ocarm – Maria Rosaria Del Genio – N. Suffi (dirs.), Dizionario di mistica. Libreria Editrice Vaticana, Città del Vaticano, pp. 624–626.

External links

 Dag Hammarskjold papers at the United Nations Archives
Death of Dag Hammarskjöld on UN Archives website
 Dag Hammarskjöld – biography, quotes, photos and videos
 UNSG Dag Hammarskjold Conference on 9–10 November 2011 at Peace Palace
 UNSG Ban Ki-Moon Lays Wreath Honouring Dag Hammarskjold of 1 October 2009 and UNSG with King Carl XVI Gustaf of Sweden
 UNSG Kofi Annan, Dag Hammarskjöld and the 21st century, The Fourth Dag Hammarskjöld Lecture 6 September 2001, Dag Hammarskjöld Foundation and Uppsala University (pdf)
 About Dag Hammarskjöld (Dag Hammarskjöld Foundation)
 United Nations Secretaries-General
 Dag Hammarskjöld, Secretary-General at the official website of the UN
 
 Letters say Hammarskjöld's death Western plot
 Media briefing by Archbishop Desmond Tutu
 18 September 1961 UN Secretary-General Dag Hammarskjöld is killed and BBC
 Audio of Dag Hammarskjold's response to Russian pressure From UPI Audio Archives
 Dag Hammarskjöld's FBI files hosted at the Internet Archive

1905 births
1961 deaths
20th-century Christian mystics
20th-century Swedish economists
Burials at Uppsala old cemetery
Children of national leaders
Cold War diplomats
Members of the Swedish Academy
Nobel Peace Prize laureates
People celebrated in the Lutheran liturgical calendar
People of the Congo Crisis
People from Jönköping
Posthumous Nobel laureates
Protestant mystics
Secretaries-General of the United Nations
Stockholm University alumni
Swedish Christian mystics
Swedish diplomats
Swedish Lutherans
Swedish Nobel laureates
Swedish nobility
Uppsala University alumni
Victims of aviation accidents or incidents in 1961
Victims of aviation accidents or incidents in Zambia
Swedish officials of the United Nations
Unsolved deaths
Dag